Visa requirements for Philippine citizens are administrative entry restrictions imposed on citizens of the Philippines by the authorities of other territories. As of January 10, 2023, Philippine citizens had visa-free or visa on arrival access to 67 countries and territories, ranking the Philippine passport 78th in terms of travel freedom according to the Henley Passport Index.

Visa requirements map

Visa requirements

Certain countries allow Filipino citizens to enter without a visa if they are in a possession of a valid visa or resident permit for Canada, Ireland, the Schengen area, the United States or the United Kingdom.

Territories and disputed areas
Visa requirements for Filipino citizens for entry to various territories, disputed areas, partially recognized countries and restricted zones:

APEC Business Travel Card

Holders of an APEC Business Travel Card (ABTC)  travelling on business do not require a visa to the following countries:

1 – up to 90 days
2 – up to 60 days

The card must be used in conjunction with a passport and has the following advantages for the holder:
May undertake legitimate business in participating economies.
Expedited border crossing in all member economies, including transitional members.
Expedited scheduling of a visa interview (United States).

Non-visa restrictions

See also

Visa policy of the Philippines
Philippine passport

References and Notes

References

Notes

Philippines
Foreign relations of the Philippines